Stare Babice ("the Old Babice") is a village in Warsaw West County, Masovian Voivodeship, in east-central Poland. It is the seat of the gmina (administrative district) called Gmina Stare Babice.

In terms of population, it is the largest village in the district, with a population of 2,056 people as of 31 December 2010.

World War II history
During occupation of Poland in World War II, Babice served as location of mass executions of Jews from the Warsaw Ghetto nearby. In 1942, 110 Jews from the Gęsiówka Prison in Warsaw were murdered by the Germans in a single Babice massacre (pl).

Notes and references

 Jewish Community in Stare Babice on Virtual Shtetl
 
 

Stare Babice
Warsaw Governorate
Warsaw Voivodeship (1919–1939)
Holocaust locations in Poland